Cory Gibbs (born January 14, 1980) is an American former soccer player. He played professionally for clubs in Germany, the Netherlands and England. He also played 19 international matches for the U.S. national soccer team, including at the 2003 CONCACAF Gold Cup.

Career

College and amateur
Gibbs was born in Fort Lauderdale, Florida. He played college soccer at Brown University, joining the team in 1997. During his career, Brown won three Ivy League Championships and participated in the NCAA Tournament all four years. In 2000, Gibbs led Brown to an Ivy League championship and the Elite Eight of the NCAA Tournament. He was named Ivy League Player of the Year, and a First-Team All-American. In 2000, he spent the collegiate off season with the Palm Beach Pumas of the Premier Development League.  He was also one of three Brown soccer players, including Matthew Cross (Kansas City Wizards) and Scott Powers (Columbus Crew), to be drafted in the 2001 MLS SuperDraft.

Professional

Germany
After graduating from Brown in 2001, Gibbs decided not to play in MLS and joined FC St. Pauli of the Bundesliga. He played 25 games for St. Pauli that season, becoming the youngest American to score a goal in the Bundesliga with a goal against FC Cologne. He was also a part of the side that beat the world champions Bayern Munich, a result that earned St. Pauli the nickname of weltpokalsiegerbesieger, translated as World Club Championship Winner Beaters. St. Pauli was relegated to the 2. Bundesliga after the 2001–02 season, and Gibbs played an equally important role with the team in his second season as in his first. St. Pauli, however, was relegated again after the 2002–03 season, this time to the Regionalliga Nord, the German third division. Gibbs remained with the team, being moved from central defense to defensive midfielder.

Gibbs decided to leave St. Pauli during 2003 due to the low level of play and lack of exposure needed to secure a spot on the United States national team. A move to Jahn Regensburg of the 2. Bundesliga fell through.

MLS
Gibbs returned to the United States and play in Major League Soccer, where he would be easily visible and available for international matches. Although the Columbus Crew initially tried to acquire Gibbs, he eventually ended up with FC Dallas, then known as the Dallas Burn. Gibbs was a starter in every game for which he was available during his stint with Dallas. He made a total of 21 appearances.

Europe
On January 20, 2005, the Dutch club Feyenoord agreed on a transfer with MLS, and Gibbs signed a four and a half year contract with the club. In his first season, he made 15 appearances and scored one goal.

After injuring his knee in a U.S. national team friendly against England on May 28, 2005, Gibbs rehabbed, under the direction of Dr. Daniel Kalbac in Miami, Florida, and came back from his injury on January 19, 2006. On January 24, 2006, Feyenoord loaned Gibbs to ADO Den Haag for the remainder of the season.

Gibbs signed a pre-contract agreement with English Premier League club Charlton Athletic in May 2006 just before Alan Curbishley's departure. After a short stay at Charlton it was announced that he would leave June 30, 2008, at the end of his contract. He never played a match for Charlton due to injuries.

Return to MLS
Gibbs moved to MLS. It was expected that he would be selected by the Galaxy, who had first option to pick up his contract in the allocation listings, but he was selected by Colorado after the Galaxy passed on Gibbs in order to be able to pick Eddie Lewis. Gibbs was transferred to New England Revolution on January 21, 2010, in a trade that involved four players, MLS SuperDraft picks and allocation money.

Gibbs was selected by the Chicago Fire with the seventh pick of the MLS Re-Entry Draft on December 15, 2010. He agreed terms with the club the same day.  At the end of the 2011 season, he was named the club's Defender of the Year.

After starting in the first three games of the 2012 season, Gibbs suffered an injury, tearing his meniscus on April 4, 2012. After missing the rest of the 2012 season, he announced his retirement from the game on November 26, 2012.

International
Gibbs's return to the U.S. helped his national team career, as he received frequent callups for 2006 FIFA World Cup qualifiers. Gibbs solidified his position as one of USA's top central defenders. Since making his first full international appearance June 8, 2003, in a friendly against New Zealand, Gibbs received 19 caps.

Gibbs was initially a part of the United States' 2006 FIFA World Cup team, but he reinjured his right knee in a friendly with Morocco on May 23, 2006, and was replaced by Gregg Berhalter. Gibbs played only 45 minutes all season for Charlton's reserves following surgery to repair cartilage in his knee. Gibbs returned to international football when he was selected by Bob Bradley for the United States' March 26 match against Poland.

Personal
He is engaged to Paramount CBS Sports Talent Manager Jennifer Medvigy. They will be married on December 30, 2023, in Chicago.

Gibbs also runs a soccer camp named  'Cory Gibbs StarSoccer',  which takes place every summer in the United States.

Career statistics

Club

International

References

External links

1980 births
Living people
Sportspeople from Fort Lauderdale, Florida
ADO Den Haag players
African-American soccer players
American expatriate soccer players
American expatriate sportspeople in the Netherlands
American expatriate soccer players in Germany
American soccer players
Soccer players from Florida
Brown Bears men's soccer players
Charlton Athletic F.C. players
Chicago Fire FC players
Colorado Rapids players
FC Dallas players
Eredivisie players
Expatriate footballers in the Netherlands
Feyenoord players
FC St. Pauli players
Bundesliga players
2. Bundesliga players
New England Revolution players
Palm Beach Pumas players
United States men's international soccer players
2003 FIFA Confederations Cup players
2003 CONCACAF Gold Cup players
Major League Soccer players
USL League Two players
Major League Soccer All-Stars
United States men's under-20 international soccer players
LA Galaxy draft picks
Miami Fusion draft picks
Association football defenders
All-American men's college soccer players
21st-century African-American sportspeople
20th-century African-American people